Khuram Jehangir Wattoo (born 25 February 1976) is a Pakistani politician who had been a member of the National Assembly of Pakistan from 2008 to 2013.

Early life 
He was born on 25 February 1976.

Political career

He was elected to the National Assembly of Pakistan from Constituency NA-147 (Okara-V) as a candidate of Pakistan Peoples Party (PPP) in by-polls held in 2008. He received 79,195 votes and defeated an independent candidate, Muhammad Zafar Yasin Wattoo.

He ran for the seat of the National Assembly from Constituency NA-146 (Okara-IV) as an independent candidate in 2013 Pakistani general election but was unsuccessful. He received 647 votes and lost the seat to Rao Muhammad Ajmal Khan.

References

Living people
1976 births
Pakistani MNAs 2008–2013